The second USS Sovereign (SP-170) was an armed yacht that served in the United States Navy as a patrol vessel from 1918 to 1919.

Sovereign was built as a civilian yacht of the same name in 1911 by Charles L. Seabury and Company at Morris Heights in the Bronx, New York, for private use as a pleasure and commuting vessel. Prior to the entry of the United States into World War I in April 1917, Sovereign was registered with the U.S. Navy for potential service in time of war, and the Navy acquired her from the estate of M. C. D. Borden on 14 June 1918 for World War I service as a patrol vessel. She was commissioned as USS Sovereign (SP-170).

Sovereign served the 3rd Naval District as a patrol craft in the New York City area for ten months.

On 23 April 1919, Sovereign was stricken from the Navy List, and soon thereafter she was returned to her owners estate.

Notes

References

Department of the Navy: Naval Historical Center: Online Library of Selected Images: U.S. Navy Ships: Sovereign (American Steam Yacht, 1911). Served in 1918-1919 as USS Sovereign (SP-170)
NavSource Online: Section Patrol Craft Photo Archive USS Sovereign (SP-170)

Patrol vessels of the United States Navy
World War I patrol vessels of the United States
Steam yachts
Ships built in Morris Heights, Bronx
1911 ships